Victorian People: A Reassessment of Persons and Themes, 1851-1867 is a book by the historian Asa Briggs originally published in 1955. It is part of a trilogy that also incorporates Victorian Cities and Victorian Things.

Content
Briggs's analysis spans a relatively short part of the Victorian era, encompassing the period between the Great Exhibition of 1851 and the passage of the Second Reform Act of 1867. In particular he focuses upon the involvement of key individuals in the policies and cultural developments of the time. He argues that the period in question was one that had traditionally suffered from a lack of historical scholarship and was interesting in its own right, being the high-Victorian stage marked by a focus upon 'thought', 'work' and 'progress' and a belief in British institutions after the negotiation of the cataclysms and challenges of 1848.

The chapters are as follows:

 Introduction
 The Crystal Palace and the Men of 1851
 John Arthur Roebuck and the Crimean War
 Trollope, Bagehot, and the English Constitution
 Samuel Smiles and the Gospel of Work
 Thomas Hughes and the Public Schools
 Robert Applegarth and the Trade-Unions
 John Bright and the Creed of Reform
 Robert Lowe and the Fear of Democracy
 Benjamin Disraeli and the Leap in the Dark
 Epilogue

References

External links
 Victorian People by Asa Briggs at the Internet Archive

1955 non-fiction books
History books about the United Kingdom
History books about the 19th century